Manikam Shanmuganathan (born c. 1927) was a Malaysian former field hockey player. He competed at the 1956 Summer Olympics and the 1960 Summer Olympics.

References

External links
 

1920s births
Possibly living people
Malaysian male field hockey players
Olympic field hockey players of Malaya
Olympic field hockey players of Malaysia
Field hockey players at the 1956 Summer Olympics
Field hockey players at the 1960 Summer Olympics
People from Ipoh
Malaysian sportspeople of Indian descent
Malaysian people of Tamil descent
Asian Games medalists in field hockey
Asian Games bronze medalists for Malaysia
Medalists at the 1962 Asian Games
Field hockey players at the 1962 Asian Games